Garrya flavescens is a species of flowering shrub, known by the common name ashy silktassel.

The plant is native to the southwestern United States, and Baja California, Sonora, and Chihuahua in Mexico. It grows in many habitats, including dry forest, desert, and chaparral.

Description
Garrya flavescens is a shrub reaching a maximum height approaching three meters.

The leaves are oval-shaped, up to 7 or 8 centimeters long and about half as wide. The underside may be hairless to very hairy and pale dusty gray.

The plant is dioecious, with both male and female plants producing long hanging clusters of flowers. Female flowers give way to bunches or clusters of spherical berries covered in hairs.

See also
Madrean Sky Islands — desert habitat of the plant.

External links

Jepson Manual Treatment of Garrya flavescens
USDA Plants Profile for Garrya flavescens (Ashy silktassel)
Garrya flavescens — U.C. Photo gallery

Garryales
Flora of Arizona
Flora of Baja California
Flora of California
Flora of Chihuahua (state)
Flora of Nevada
Flora of New Mexico
Flora of Sonora
Flora of Texas
Flora of Utah
Flora of the California desert regions
Flora of the Klamath Mountains
Flora of the Sierra Nevada (United States)
Natural history of the California chaparral and woodlands
Natural history of the California Coast Ranges
Natural history of the Channel Islands of California
Natural history of the Mojave Desert
Natural history of the Peninsular Ranges
Natural history of the San Francisco Bay Area
Natural history of the Santa Monica Mountains
Natural history of the Transverse Ranges
Flora without expected TNC conservation status